"" (Gretchen at the Spinning Wheel), Op. 2,  118, is a Lied composed by Franz Schubert using the text from Part One, scene 15 of Johann Wolfgang von Goethe's Faust. With "Gretchen am Spinnrade" and some 600 other songs for voice and piano, Schubert contributed transformatively to the genre of Lied. "Gretchen am Spinnrade" was composed for soprano voice but has been transposed to accommodate other voice types. Schubert composed "Gretchen am Spinnrade" on 19 October 1814, three months before his eighteenth birthday.

German text
Meine Ruh' ist hin,
Mein Herz ist schwer;
Ich finde sie nimmer
Und nimmermehr.

Wo ich ihn nicht hab'
Ist mir das Grab,
Die ganze Welt
Ist mir vergällt.

Mein armer Kopf
Ist mir verrückt,
Mein armer Sinn
Ist mir zerstückt.

Meine Ruh' ist hin,
Mein Herz ist schwer;
Ich finde sie nimmer
Und nimmermehr.

Nach ihm nur schau' ich
Zum Fenster hinaus,
Nach ihm nur geh' ich
Aus dem Haus.

Sein hoher Gang,
Sein' edle Gestalt,
Seines Mundes Lächeln,
Seiner Augen Gewalt,

Und seiner Rede
Zauberfluß,
Sein Händedruck,
Und ach sein Kuß!

Meine Ruh' ist hin,
Mein Herz ist schwer,
Ich finde sie nimmer
Und nimmermehr.

Mein Busen drängt
Sich nach ihm hin.
Ach dürft ich fassen
Und halten ihn!

Und küssen ihn
So wie ich wollt',
An seinen Küssen
Vergehen sollt'!

Analysis

The song is in three sections, exactly reflecting the form of Goethe's poem. On the other hand, Schubert contradicts Gretchen's return to composure in the last three stanzas by obsessively repeating her words to create a second climax on the highest note of the song.

The song opens with Gretchen at her spinning wheel, thinking of Faust and all that he had promised. The accompaniment in the right hand mimics the perpetual movement of the spinning-wheel and the left hand imitates the foot treadle. The initial key of D minor sets a longing tone as Gretchen begins to sing of her heartache ("Meine Ruh' ist hin/Mein herz ist schwer"). The first section progresses from D minor to C major, A minor, E minor, F major, and then returns to D minor. This, plus the crescendo, builds tension which releases only to be brought back to the beginning, much like the ever-circling spinning wheel. The song modulates to F major as Gretchen starts talking of Faust ("Sein hoher Gang/Sein' edle Gestalt"). The left-hand imitation of the treadle disappears and changes to block chords. Additionally, the absence of the rhythmic, consistent treadle allows Gretchen to lose her sense of stability and reality as she swoons over Faust. This section increases tension with a faster tempo, louder dynamics, and higher pitch in the soprano and peaks at Gretchen's remembrance of Faust's kiss ("Und ach, sein Kuß!"). Similar to the previous section, the music returns to the home key of D minor as Gretchen resumes reality and begins her spinning once more. The third part begins again with "Meine Ruh' ist hin/Mein herz ist schwer," but this time Gretchen escalates in intensity much faster than the previous sections. However, the treadle-like left hand is present, keeping her rooted in reality. Gretchen comes down from this fantasy quicker than before, as she realizes she and Faust will never be together. With a heavy heart, Gretchen comes to terms with this hard truth. The song ends as it began: in D minor, alluding to the monotony of the spinning wheel, and how reality is always present.

Notable recordings
Notable recordings include those by
 Elly Ameling and Jörg Demus
 Elly Ameling and Dalton Baldwin
 Barbara Bonney and Geoffrey Parsons
 Janet Baker and Gerald Moore.
 Anne Sofie von Otter, Schubert Lieder with Orchestra, CD, accompanied by the Chamber Orchestra of Europe led by Claudio Abbado.
Other notable recordings include those by Kathleen Ferrier, Renée Fleming, Brigitte Fassbaender, Janet Baker, Kiri Te Kanawa, Dawn Upshaw, Christa Ludwig, Gundula Janowitz, Jessye Norman, Irmgard Seefried, Elisabeth Schumann, Lotte Lehmann, Rosette Anday, and Elisabeth Schwarzkopf. Nina Hagen, titled "Gretchen" on her 1991 album Street is an interesting electronic adaptation.

References

Sources

External links

German text and English translation, lieder.net
Full score and MIDI file  at Mutopia
, Kiri Te Kanawa, Richard Amner
"History and Theory Behind 'Gretchen am Spinnrade', D. 118" by Brenda Malvini, December 2008

Lieder composed by Franz Schubert
Music based on Goethe's Faust
Musical settings of poems by Johann Wolfgang von Goethe
1814 compositions